Maria Luiza Pereira Passos (born 9 June 1951) is a Brazilian retired para table tennis player who competed at international table tennis competitions. She formerly played in volleyball before being diagnosed with a malignant tumour in her bone marrow, requiring the use of a wheelchair. She is a five-time Parapan American Games medalist and has competed at the 1996, 2008 and 2012 Summer Paralympics.

References

1951 births
Living people
Paralympic table tennis players of Brazil
Medalists at the 2007 Parapan American Games
Medalists at the 2011 Parapan American Games
Medalists at the 2015 Parapan American Games
Table tennis players at the 1996 Summer Paralympics
Table tennis players at the 2008 Summer Paralympics
Table tennis players at the 2012 Summer Paralympics
Brazilian female table tennis players
21st-century Brazilian women